San Antonio Lake may refer to the following places:

 Lake San Antonio, California, United States
 San Antonio Lagoon (Bolivia)
 San Antonio Lagoon (Peru), Huanta District